Surrey is a city in British Columbia, Canada. It is located south of the Fraser River on the Canada–United States border. It is a member municipality of the Metro Vancouver regional district and metropolitan area. Mainly a suburban city, Surrey is the province's second-largest by population after Vancouver and the third-largest by area after Abbotsford and Prince George. Seven neighbourhoods in Surrey are designated town centres: Cloverdale, Fleetwood, Guildford, Newton, South Surrey, and City Centre encompassed by Whalley.

History 

Surrey was incorporated in 1879, and encompasses land formerly occupied by a number of Halqemeylem-speaking indigenous groups. When Englishman H.J. Brewer looked across the Fraser River from New Westminster and saw a land reminiscent of his native County of Surrey in England, the settlement of Surrey was placed on the map. The area then comprised forests of douglas fir, fir, red cedar, hemlock, blackberry bushes, and cranberry bogs. A portion of present-day Whalley (named after Harry Whalley, who owned and operated a gas bar at the bend in King George Blvd, (formerly King George Highway) at 108 Avenue, "Whalley's Corner") was used as a burial ground by the Kwantlen (or Qw'ontl'en) Nation.

Settlers arrived first in Cloverdale and parts of South Surrey, mostly to farm, fish, harvest oysters, or set up small stores. Once the Pattullo Bridge was erected in 1937, the way was open for Surrey to expand. In the post-war 1950s, North Surrey's neighbourhoods filled with single-family homes and Surrey (not yet a city) became a bedroom community, absorbing commuters who worked in Burnaby or Vancouver.

In the 1980s and 1990s, the city witnessed unprecedented growth, as people from different parts of Canada and the world, particularly Asia, began to make the municipality their home. In 2013, it was projected to surpass the city of Vancouver as the most populous city in BC within the following 10 to 12 years.

Government and politics 

Surrey is governed by the elected Surrey City Council comprising the mayor and eight councillors. The current mayor is Brenda Locke, who took office on October 15, 2022. The last elections were held in October 2015. Current City Councillors are: Linda Annis, Doug Elford, Laurie Guerra, Jack Singh Hundial, Brenda Locke, Mandeep Nagra, Allison Patton, and Steven Pettigrew.

In the 2020 provincial election, the BC NDP kept at least their previously six elected MLAs (potentially seven), while the number of MLAs for the BC Liberals will have between two and three.

In 1997, Gurmant Grewal became the first visible minority elected in Surrey. In 2004, when his wife, Nina was elected to parliament, they became the first married couple to serve Canadian parliament concurrently. Following the 2015 federal election, the Liberal Party of Canada won three of Surrey's four seats in the House of Commons of Canada. Conservative MP Dianne Watts resigned her South Surrey-White Rock seat in 2017 to compete for the leadership of the BC Liberal Party. In the subsequent 2017 by-election, the Liberal candidate Gordie Hogg defeated former Conservative MP and federal cabinet minister Kerry-Lynne Findlay.

Demographics 

Surrey is the 11th largest city in Canada, and is also the fifth-largest city in Western Canada (after Calgary, Edmonton, Winnipeg and Vancouver). Surrey forms an integral part of Metro Vancouver as it is the second largest city in the region, albeit while also serving as the secondary economic core of the metropolitan area. When combined with the City of Vancouver, both cities account for nearly 50% of the region's population. In recent years, a rapidly expanding urban core in Downtown Surrey, located in Whalley has transformed the area into the secondary downtown core in Metro Vancouver.

Ethnicity 
Within the City of Surrey itself feature many neighbourhoods including City Centre, Whalley, Newton, Guildford, Fleetwood, Cloverdale and South Surrey. Each neighbourhood is unique and includes ethnically diverse populations. While Europeans and South Asians can be found in large numbers across the city, areas which house a large proportion of the former include South Surrey (72%) and Cloverdale (69%), with Newton (58%) and Whalley (51%) being home to large numbers of the latter.

Immigration to Surrey has drastically increased since the 1980s; this has created a more ethnically and linguistically diverse city. 52% do not speak English as their first language, while approximately 38% of the city's inhabitants are of South Asian heritage. Beginning in the 1990s, an influx of South Asians began moving to the city from neighbouring Vancouver due to rising housing costs and rapidly increasing rent costs for businesses. The outflow of these residents combined with increased immigration from the Indian Subcontinent therefore established in Surrey one of the largest concentrations of South Asian residents in North America.

Other significant groups which reside in the city include East Asians (10.9%) and Southeast Asians (9.7%). Forming nearly 2.3% of the total population, the Black community of Surrey is small however the city is home to the largest Black population in British Columbia; roughly 21% of the entire Black community in the province resides in Surrey. Similar to most cities across Canada, a large majority (64%) of Surrey residents of European heritage can trace their roots to the British Isles.

Religion 

Proportionally, Surrey has the largest Sikh population percentage (27.4%) out of all subdivisions in Canada. 

As of 2021, the top five most reported religious affiliations in Surrey were Christianity (170,115 or 30.2%), Irreligion (161,860 or 28.6%), Sikhism (154,415 or 27.4%), Islam (31,095 or 5.5%), and Hinduism (30,455 or 5.4%).

Language

Economic indicators 

The average family income was $85,765. South Surrey area had the highest average household income of all six town centres in Surrey, with an average of $86,824 as of 2010. Median household income was also high at $62,960. South Surrey's neighbourhood of Rosemary Heights is the richest in Surrey and throughout the Metro Vancouver area, with a median income more than twice the regional average.

As of 2010, the median household income of Surrey was $67,702 (versus the national median of $76,437), where 29.4 percent of households in Surrey earned a household total income of $100,000 or more, which is above the national average of 25.9 percent.

Geography 

The city is characterized by low population density urban sprawl, typical of North American cities, which includes areas of residential housing, light industry and commercial centres and is prone to strip development and malls. Approximately  or 27 percent of the land area is designated as part of the Agricultural Land Reserve and can only be used for farming. The city is mostly hills and flatland, with most of the flatland in Tynehead, Hazelmere, the south of Cloverdale, and Colebrook.

Climate 
Surrey has an oceanic climate (Cfb) typical of the inter-coastal Pacific Northwest: rainy, wet winters, often with heavy rainfall lasting into early spring. Winters are chilly but not frigid, summers are mild and sunny, and autumns are cool and cloudy.

Economy 

Surrey is one of the largest industrial centres within British Columbia, with a burgeoning high technology, clean energy, advanced manufacturing, health, education, agriculture, and arts sector.

Increase in filming activity in Surrey resulted in 189 productions, including 15 at the city hall plaza, in 2017.

In 2018, Surrey opened a $68 million biofuel facility, the first in North America.

There were six employers in Surrey in 2017 each with more than 1,000 staff across BC: Fraser Health with 25,000; School District 36 with 10,560; City of Surrey with 3,400; Coast Capital Savings with 1,738; Starline Windows Group with 1,400; Kwantlen Polytechnic University with 1,332.

Agriculture 

Farming has strongly been attached to the economic well-being of Surrey, as the city of Surrey itself fostered and cemented a robust culture of farming. Approximately a third of Surrey's land is preserved and designated as farmland that is utilized for the local production of food to cater the city's growing population as well as increasing employment opportunities via the creation of local jobs. Agriculture continues to invigorate Surrey's economy employing 3300 people or 1.6 percent of Surrey's overall labour force. Manufacturing is also a highly diversified sector where products are produced for developed and emerging industries that range from the cutting of lumber for various BC logging firms to constructing wind turbines as many Surrey-based environmental firms are capitalizing on the city's initiatives for the clean energy sector.

Health care 

The health sector makes a significant contribution to Surrey's economy. Surrey is home to almost 900 health-related businesses where major focuses in several life science sub-sectors that include infectious diseases, marine bio-science, neuroscience, oncology and regenerative medicine. Surrey Memorial Hospital is the second largest employer in the City of Surrey with an annual operating budget of $149.2million while the health care organization, Fraser Health employs more than 4,100 people and an additional 350 active physicians at SMH. Due to population growth in the region, a new hospital in Surrey is planned to be built in Cloverdale; it is projected to be completed in 2026.

Technology 

Although not as large as Vancouver's technology sector, Surrey also has an emerging tech sector with a highly anticipated incubator that will potentially act as a base to jump-start ideas into various start-up companies from local innovators, inventors, investors and entrepreneurs.

Education 

Of the city's population over the age of 25, 23.7% hold a bachelor's degree or higher, slightly below the national average of 25.8% and 47.2% work in professional and managerial jobs, compared with the national average of 52.7%.

Schools 
School District 36 Surrey oversees 100 public elementary and 21 public secondary schools in Surrey, making it the largest public school district in British Columbia. The Conseil scolaire francophone de la Colombie-Britannique operates one Francophone school in the city: École Gabrielle-Roy, which includes primary and secondary levels.

Higher education 
Surrey's local higher education needs are met by the two major universities in the neighboring municipalities of the Vancouver Metropolitan Area, the University of British Columbia and Simon Fraser University. In addition to several career, community, and junior colleges that offer vocational and polytechnic education throughout the city, trades and technical career education is mainly provided by colleges such as Kwantlen Polytechnic University in the Cloverdale and Newton area and by the British Columbia Institute of Technology in the neighboring municipality of Burnaby. 

Surrey is home to the third satellite campus of Simon Fraser University, the SFU Surrey Campus, which opened its doors in Surrey in 2002, acting as a satellite campus operating as a public research university as well as providing further impetus for shaping the city. SFU took over the space and programming that was initially built for TechBC, a technical university proposed for south of the Fraser River by the NDP provincial government of the 1990s. SFU Surrey offers a number of programs, including TechOne and Explorations; first-year cohort options; and studies in Health Science, Applied Sciences, Natural Sciences, Liberal Arts, Business Administration, and Interactive Arts and Technology.

Surrey is also the home of Kwantlen Polytechnic University, a polytechnic university that opened its doors in the Newton Town Centre of Surrey in 1981 as a response to the growing need for expanded vocational training across the Fraser Valley. Kwantlen Polytechnic University was granted a university designation from the BC provincial government, upgrading itself from a community college to an official academic teaching institution that has become renowned in applied research. Since then, it has expanded to provide satellite campuses in Richmond, Langley, and a trades and technology centre in the Cloverdale Town Centre. The Surrey campus offers university transfer, career-training and academic-upgrading programs with focuses on science, business, arts, and health, including a publicly accessible wellness centre, while the Cloverdale campus offers vocational training through apprenticeships, citations, certificates, and diplomas for skilled trades and technical careers.

In November 2021, the University of British Columbia announced plans to establish a location in Surrey just north of Surrey Memorial Hospital.

Besides Kwantlen Polytechnic University, Surrey also hosts vocational education many private post-secondary institutions offering vocational training including Brighton College, Sprott Shaw College, Pacific Link College, CDI College, Western Community College, Sterling College, Stenberg College, Academy of Learning, Surrey Community College, Discovery Community College and Vancouver Career College.

Culture

Attractions 

The Museum of Surrey is affiliated with CMA, CHIN, and Virtual Museum of Canada. It reopened as the Museum of Surrey on September 29, 2018, after a renovation which added  to the previous  building.

Surrey Art Gallery is the second largest public art museum in the Metro Vancouver region. It opened on September 13, 1975.

The historic Surrey Municipal Hall complex includes the Cenotaph in Heritage Square, the Surrey Museum, and Cloverdale Library. The Surrey City Centre Public Library located at Whalley / City Centre is the second largest library in terms of size in Metro Vancouver.

"REMEMBRANCE" by André Gauthier (sculptor) in Heritage Square, is an oversized bronze statue depicting a World War I kneeling soldier, helmet in hand, in remembrance of his fallen comrades.

Events 

Attracting 15,000 people every February since 2004, WinterFest is a day of live music, sporting activities, food, and fireworks, held at the Central City Plaza.

Since 1888, the town centre of Cloverdale has hosted the annual Cloverdale Rodeo and Country Fair at the Cloverdale Fairgrounds every May long weekend. The Fair is Canada's second largest rodeo, and it features  of family-oriented entertainment including agricultural/horticultural exhibits, a western tradeshow, parade, community stages, and the Pacific Northwest Firefighter Combat Challenge.

Every year on April 13, the Sikh community celebrates Vaisakhi, which often includes a nagar kirtan, or parade, and free food is often handed out. It is the largest Vaiskahi parade outside India, growing from 100,000 attendees in 2008 to over 500,000 in 2019.

Every October since 1991, Surrey has hosted the Surrey International Writers' Conference. This event brings established writers, agents, editors and publishers from all over the world to the Comfort Inn & Suites Surrey Hotel and Sheraton Vancouver Guildford Hotel in Guildford Town Centre.

There are presently three live theatre venues in the City of Surrey in British Columbia as of January 2013: the Bell Centre for Performing Arts, the Chandos Pattison Auditorium and the Surrey Arts Centre.

One of the lesser-known events in Surrey is the annual Nicomekl River Race. Every year, in early June, teams of four meet at Nicomekl Park in Langley, British Columbia to begin the race. Unlike most traditional boat races, the Nicomekl River Race requires that all boats be made by the participants. The racecourse extends from Nicomekl Park to Blackie Spit Park at Crescent Beach. The first team to reach the mouth of the river is awarded a prize of $1,000. Additional prizes are awarded to the most creative boat and costume. All proceeds go towards the BC Cancer society.

News media 

In addition to news media from Vancouver, the community is served by The Surrey Now-Leader newspaper, and the Peace Arch News newspaper (for South Surrey). The city is also home to South Asian Broadcasting's ethnic radio station ReD-FM and the Asian Journal newspaper.

The first Surrey-based English-language radio station, My Surrey FM 107.7 FM, was licensed by the CRTC in 2014 and is now Pulse FM 107.7 reporting about South of the Fraser news. Radio India, another Indo-Canadian radio station, has its offices in Surrey.

Sports and recreation 

Every summer, Surrey hosts the Canada Cup International Women's Fastpitch Tournament. It began in 1993 as an international women's fastpitch developmental softball tournament to help teams prepare for the Olympics by facing top-calibre competition. The event continues to be a fan favourite with gate attendance reaching 93,000 for the nine-day tournament in 2004.

The BCHL Surrey Eagles hockey team plays at the South Surrey Arena in Surrey. The Eagles won the BCHL championship, the Fred Page Cup, in 1997, 1998, 2005 and 2013; the western championship, the Doyle Cup, in 1997 and 1998; and the national championship, the Royal Bank Cup, in 1998.

Surrey hosted the Canadian national qualifying tournament in 2006, and sends a local team to compete for a spot in the Little League World Series in Williamsport, Pennsylvania.

Surrey is also home to Canada's first kabaddi-specific stadium.

Although not considered a sport, the globally acclaimed dance company known as "Brotherhood" won gold trophies at the World Hip Hop Dance Championships in 2013 and 2014 for the varsity and adult divisions. The affiliated dance production team known as "PraiseTEAM" had taken home the silver trophy at the world finals in 2013 as well. Both dance companies are from Surrey.

Cricket is also played in Surrey. There are more than 85 teams registered with British Columbia Mainland Cricket League. There are more than 20 cricket pitches across Surrey, though the only turf pitch is in West Newton.

Transportation

History
The first non-Indigenous settlement of Surrey was founded near Crescent Beach, located in South Surrey; another was founded near Bridgeview/Brownsville, located in North Surrey. Early trails and roads helped to encourage the settlement of Surrey. The first trail built by a settler was the 1861 the Kennedy Trail. James Kennedy built the trail to provide a route between New Westminster and the natural pasture land on the Mud Bay Flats next to the Serpentine River. The Semiahmoo Wagon Road was built in 1873 between Brownsville (opposite New Westminster) and Semiahmoo (Blaine). The first regular ferry service across the Fraser River started in 1882 on the steam ferry K de K, with the point of departure at Brownsville. The ferry landed on the Surrey side at the start of Old Yale Road, which connected directly inland to Yale and was a major gold rush trail.

The New Westminster Rail Bridge was opened in 1904, allowing personal vehicles to cross the Fraser River on the upper deck. The lower deck, for rail, enabled BC Electric Railway to finally construct the Interurban line, an electric suburb commuter rail route connecting Chilliwack to Vancouver. It opened for service in 1910, and ran through Kennedy, Newton, Sullivan, and Cloverdale. Currently, two of the BCER cars (1225 & 1304) are nearly finished being restored for operation on the mainline between Cloverdale and Sullivan. New car barns and museum currently under construction in Cloverdale (as of 2012).

In 1937, the then two-lane Pattullo Bridge linking New Westminster and Surrey was opened.

In the early 1950s, BC Electric Railways ceased operating its interurban line, thus increasing the number of vehicles on Surrey roads. Highway 10 was built in 1953, and Highway 15 in 1957. In 1964, the provincial government completed Highway 401 and the Port Mann Bridge; that section of roadway would later be renamed Highway 1. In 1959, the George Massey Tunnel was opened, along with what is known as Highway 99. With the completion of the new Highways 1 and 99, the Fraser Highway and King George Boulevard became major arteries.

In the early 1990s, Surrey saw the return of rail transit with the SkyTrain Expo Line expansion into Surrey. The four stations added were Scott Road, Gateway, Surrey Central and King George.

Current transportation network

Public transit in Surrey, as with the rest of Metro Vancouver, is operated by TransLink, which provides frequent bus service throughout Surrey, and to other Metro Vancouver municipalities. Metro Vancouver's metropolitan rail system, SkyTrain, provides Surrey with an Expo Line service to Downtown Vancouver via four stations: Scott Road, Gateway, Surrey Central, and King George.

The Canadian National Railway, Canadian Pacific Railway, BNSF Railway, and Southern Railway of British Columbia have trackage running through Surrey.

Vancouver International Airport offers direct daily service to destinations in Canada, North America, Europe, and Asia.

Seaport facilities are available at the Fraser River Docks.

Future transportation
Funding a light rail transit (LRT) line linking both Newton and Guildford with Surrey City Centre was agreed to by both BC's provincial government and the federal government. The project was unpopular, and after electing a new mayor and council in October 2018, who had run on a platform to cancel the LRT line in favour of extending the existing SkyTrain line to Langley, made it their first order of business. TransLink's Mayors' Council, who has the ultimate authority over the project, responded to this decision by indefinitely suspending work on the light rail project. In July 2019, a  Expo Line extension from King George station to 166 Street and Fraser Highway in Fleetwood was approved and is estimated to be completed by 2025. However, the plan is now to take the SkyTrain the entire way to Langley in one phase by 2028.

Sustainable development 

In 2008, Surrey city council created and adopted the Surrey Sustainability Charter: a comprehensive document spanning 72 pages that takes a comprehensive look at all facets of society and creates an overarching document to guide the urban development of the city for the next 50 years. In 2011, the city council released the second update to the 2008 document indicating the progress made in the three years since the inception of the report.

Problems 
Being an all-inclusive plan requires an interplay of many complex and sometimes wicked problems. Trying to account for all problems is ambitious, and as the report admits, being at the municipal level reduces the funding, power and resources to implement the vision. The report acknowledges the political hurdle and notes that the city needs to influence players with more power such as the provincial or federal government in order for the vision to be successful.

Some other hurdles that have arisen since the inception of the charter include the following:

Suburban sprawl and the Gateway Program 

Surrey currently faces the problem of urban sprawl, the phenomenon that is characterized by the low density residential, with almost no commercial or industrial zoning. This results in a heavy outflow of traffic in the morning, and inflow in the evening.

The announcement of the Gateway Program in 2005 by the British Columbia Ministry of Transportation meant a large expenditure in transportation infrastructure. Despite the oppositions by the Metro Vancouver and several mayoral councils, the project went ahead to create the South Fraser Perimeter Road and the Port Mann Bridge, both which pass through major portions of Surrey. It has been criticized to be contradictory to not only Metro Vancouver's Sustainable Region Initiative, but also Surrey's Sustainability Charter. Studies have shown that with an increase in road capacity, generated traffic increases, that is traffic that is diverted (shifted in time and route) and induced travel (increased total motor vehicle travel). With the construction of the 10 lane Port Mann Bridge, the problem of suburban sprawl is exacerbated not only with the additional capacity, but RapidBus service was also cancelled despite expectations of a stop in Surrey.

Transportation and land use 

The Sustainability Charter hinges on a large reduction on automobile dependency requiring a well established transit infrastructure to the multiple districts of Surrey. In 2008, Gordon Campbell announced the extension of the Expo Line beyond the current terminus to as far as Langley. However, financial shortfall came upon Translink shortly after, and many of the announced plans came to a halt. Plans to expand northward via the Evergreen extension came to fruition prior to the vision of extending light rail out to Guildford, Newton and Langley. Mayor Watts attempted impose equal tolling across the region to assist with funding transit to reduce car reliance.

Protecting agricultural land reserves also play an important part in the charter of sustainability. The idea behind the agricultural land reserves is to encourage and increase the role of urban agriculture, thus reducing the reliance of food transport and increasing the quality and availability of food to local people. The Charter takes the idea one step further by encouraging food processing agribusiness to complete the supply chain circle.

In a case study of Toronto completed by Pierre Filion, he claims that while transit and natural area conservation are successful at achieving their respective immediate objectives, they "do not modify metropolitan-wide relations between transportation and land use...in a fashion that is consistent with smart growth". Filion identifies that the largest obstacles are NIMBY reactions from the public and the limited finances from the public sector.

Notable people 

 Carolyn Arends, singer-songwriter and author
 Karan Aujla, singer, songwriter and rapper
 Harry Bains, politician
 Nuvraj Bassi, professional football player
 Jagrup Brar, politician
 Jean-Luc Bilodeau, actor
 Margaret Bridgman, politician
 Lisa Brokop, singer
 Laurent Brossoit, professional hockey goaltender
 Chuck Cadman, politician
 Dona Cadman, Member of Parliament and widow of Chuck Cadman
 Gulzar Singh Cheema, physician and politician
 Jasbir Singh Cheema, politician
 Eleanor Collins, jazz singer, TV host and civic leader
 Ryan D'Arcy, neuroscientist researcher
 Narima dela Cruz, politician
 Baltej Singh Dhillon, first Royal Canadian Mounted Police officer allowed to wear a turban
 Ranj Dhaliwal, author
 Sukh Dhaliwal, politician
 Brenden Dillon, professional hockey player
 Emmalyn Estrada, singer, songwriter, actress and sister of Elise Estrada
 Elise Estrada, singer, songwriter, actress and sister of Emmalyn Estrada
 Kevin Falcon, politician
 Peter Fassbender, politician
 Colin Fraser, professional ice hockey player
 Curtis Fraser, professional ice hockey player
 Gurmant Grewal, politician
 Nina Grewal, politician
 Scott Hannan, professional hockey player
 Dave Hayer, politician
 Kamal Heer, Punjabi singer
 Russ Hiebert, politician
 Jacob Hoggard, lead singer of Hedley
 Britt Irvin, actress, singer, voice-over artist
 Daniel Igali, 2000 Olympic gold medalist for freestyle wrestling
 Mark Janssens, professional hockey player
 Tristan Jarry, professional hockey goaltender
 Jujhar Khaira, professional hockey player
 Sydney Leroux, professional soccer player
 Adam Loewen, first baseman/outfielder under minor-league contract for the Toronto Blue Jays
 Harbhajan Mann, Punjabi singer
 Alen Marcina, Professional soccer player and coach
 Laura Mennell, actress
 Merkules, rapper Cole Stevenson
 Tyler Joe Miller, country singer, songwriter, and humanitarian
 Victoria Moors, Canadian gymnast at the 2012 Summer Olympics
 Gary Nylund, professional hockey player
 Shallon Olsen, Olympic artistic gymnast
 Missy Peregrym, actress and former fashion model
 Penny Priddy, politician
 Michael Rasmussen (ice hockey) NHL player for the Detroit Red Wings
 Paul Rodgers, vocalist with Free and Bad Company
 Gordon Rice, artist
 Jasbir Sandhu, politician
 Linus Sebastian, videographer; CEO of Linus Media Group
 Geroy Simon, professional football player
 Jinny Sims, politician
 Lauren Southern, internet personality, writer, and political activist
 Kalib Starnes, professional mixed martial artist
 Heather Stilwell, politician and activist
 John Tenta, professional wrestler nicknamed "Earthquake"
 Aaron Voros, professional hockey player
 Manmohan Waris, Punjabi singer
 Nolan Watson, businessman, philanthropist, and humanitarian
 Dianne Watts, politician; first female Mayor of Surrey
 Parker Wotherspoon, professional ice hockey player

Affiliated cities and municipalities 

Surrey has two sister cities:

Surrey also has six "friendship cities":

See also
 
List of tallest buildings in Surrey

Notes

References

Further reading 

 Sinoski, Kelly. "The New Surrey: The city's not-so-secret weapon" (Archive). Vancouver Sun. March 9, 2013.

External links 

 
 

 
Cities in British Columbia
Ethnic enclaves in Canada
Populated places established in 1879
Populated places in Greater Vancouver
Populated places on the Fraser River
Sikh enclaves